Pavol Hrivnák (9 October 1931 – 3 February 1995) was a Slovak politician who served as prime minister of the Slovak Socialist Republic from June to December 1989.

Biography
Hrivnák was born in Malý Čepčín on 9 October 1931. He was a member of the Slovak Communist Party and the Communist Party of Czechoslovakia. He was named member of the Slovak Communist Party Politburo in May 1971 and became Politburo member of the Czech Communist Party in December 1986.

On 12 October 1988, he was named first deputy minister in the federal government led by Ladislav Adamec. Hrivnák was appointed Prime Minister of Slovakia on 22 June 1989, replacing Ivan Knotek in the post, but his tenure lasted very brief and on 8 December 1989, Hrivnák and his cabinet resigned. The chairmanship of the Slovak National Council (SNR) accepted the resignation. Then Milan Čič was asked to form a new cabinet.

Hrivnák died on 3 February 1995 in Bratislava and was buried in the National Cemetery.

See also
 List of prime ministers of the Slovak Socialist Republic

References

External links

|-

1931 births
1995 deaths
Communist Party of Czechoslovakia politicians
Czech people of Slovak descent
Government ministers of Czechoslovakia
People from Turčianske Teplice District
Prime Ministers of Slovakia